Preiser Records is an independent Austrian record label. It was founded in 1952 by Otto G. Preiser (1920–1996).

The label is particularly important for recordings from the Viennese cabaret scene, especially from the 1950s and 1960s (Helmut Qualtinger, Georg Kreisler, Gerhard Bronner), and for the re-release of historical vocal recordings in the series Lebendige Vergangenheit, which has been in existence since 1966.

References

External links 
 Preiser Records
 Preiser Records Vienna
 On the death of Jürgen Schmidt (Preiser-Records)

Austrian independent record labels
Classical music record labels
IFPI members
1952 establishments in Austria